The 2016 Dynamic Northern Cyprus Open,
was the third Euro Tour 9-Ball pool event in 2016. The event was won by Austria's Mario He who defeated Greece's Nikos Ekonomopoulos 9–5 in the final. In winning the event, He won his first Euro Tour event.

Tournament format
The event saw a total of 143 players compete, in a double-elimination knockout tournament, until the last 32 stage; where the tournament was contested as single elimination.

Prize fund 
The tournament prize fund will be similar to that of other Euro Tour events, with €4,500 for the winner of the event.

Tournament results

References

External links

Euro Tour
Sporting events in Cyprus
2016 Euro Tour events
2016 in Cypriot sport
International sports competitions hosted by Cyprus